Ralph Edward "Ed" Eberhart (born December 6, 1946) is a retired four-star general in the United States Air Force (USAF). He served as the commander of North American Aerospace Defense Command (NORAD) and United States Northern Command, Peterson Air Force Base, Colorado. He was in charge of NORAD during the September 11 attacks in 2001.

Biography
Eberhart entered the USAF in 1968 as a graduate of the United States Air Force Academy, having been the cadet wing commander during his senior year.

A command pilot, General Eberhart has logged more than 5,000 hours, primarily in fighter and trainer aircraft, including 300 combat missions as a forward air controller in the Vietnam War.

While commander of the 363rd Tactical Fighter Wing during Operation Desert Shield, the unit established the theater's initial air-to-ground combat capability from a forward operating location.

While he was lieutenant general in January 1996, Eberhart produced a novel concept in operational doctrine: "that a joint force commander could profitably use his air component to attack deep battle targets or at the start of an expeditionary operation before ground forces were in place." Chief of Staff of the Air Force general Ronald Fogleman embraced this doctrine, saying in April 1996: "The need for mass on the battlefield has now changed. We don’t need to occupy an enemy’s country to defeat his strategy. We can reduce his combat capabilities and in many instances defeat his armed forces from the air."

Eberhart's staff experience includes serving as executive officer to the Chief of Staff of the Air Force at Headquarters USAF; Deputy Chief of Staff for Inspection, Safety and Security, Headquarters Tactical Air Command; Director for Programs and Evaluation, Headquarters USAF; Director of Force Structure, Resources and Assessment, the Joint Staff; and Deputy Chief of Staff for Plans and Operations, Headquarters USAF. The general has also served as Vice Chief of Staff of the Air Force, commander, Air Combat Command, Commander, Air Force Space Command, and as commander-in-chief, United States Space Command.

Eberhart has commanded a flight, squadron, wing, numbered air force and two major commands, as well as one sub-unified command, two unified commands and one bi-national command.

Eberhart's international awards include the Grand Cordon of the Order of the Sacred Treasure, presented while serving as the Commander of United States Forces Japan, by the Emperor of Japan, as well as the French Legion of Honor.

Education

1964 McCluer High School, Florissant, Missouri
1968 Bachelor of Science degree in political science, United States Air Force Academy, Colorado Springs, Colorado
1973 Squadron Officer School, Maxwell AFB, Alabama, by correspondence
1974 Air Command and Staff College, Maxwell AFB, Alabama, by correspondence
1977 Master's degree in political science, Troy State University
1987 National War College, Fort Lesley J. McNair, Washington, D.C.

Assignments
 August 1968 – August 1969, student, Undergraduate Pilot Training, 615th Student Squadron, Air Training Command, Craig AFB, Alabama
 February 1970 – December 1970, forward air controller, 20th Tactical Air Support Squadron, Pleiku Air Base, South Vietnam
 December 1970 – June 1974, T-38 Talon instructor pilot, assistant flight commander, flight commander and headquarters squadron commander, 71st Flying Training Wing, Vance AFB, Oklahoma
 June 1974 – June 1975, resource manager, Air Staff Training Program, Special Category Management Section, Rated Career Management Branch, Headquarters Air Force Military Personnel Center, Randolph AFB, Texas
 December 1975 – February 1977, F-4E Phantom II flight commander and instructor pilot, 525th Tactical Fighter Squadron, Bitburg AB, West Germany
 February 1977 – December 1978, F-4E instructor pilot, standardization and evaluation flight examiner, and assistant Chief, Standardization and Evaluation, 50th Tactical Fighter Wing, Hahn AB, West Germany
 January 1979 – July 1980, action officer, Readiness Initiative Group, Directorate of Operations, later, Chief, Executive Committee, Air Force Budget Issues Team, Directorate of Plans, Congressional and External Affairs Division, Headquarters U.S. Air Force, Washington, D.C.
 July 1980 – June 1982, aide to the Commander in Chief, Headquarters United States Air Forces in Europe, and Commander, Allied Air Forces Central Europe, Ramstein AB, West Germany
 September 1982 – May 1984, commander, 10th Tactical Fighter Squadron, later, Assistant Deputy Commander for Operations, 50th Tactical Fighter Wing, Hahn AB, West Germany
 May 1984 – July 1986, executive officer to the Air Force Chief of Staff, Headquarters U.S. Air Force, Washington, D.C.
 July 1986 – July 1987, student, National War College, Fort Lesley J. McNair, Washington, D.C.
 July 1987 – October 1990, vice commander, later, commander, 363rd Tactical Fighter Wing, Shaw AFB, South Carolina
 October 1990 – February 1991, Deputy Chief of Staff for Inspection, Safety and Security, Headquarters Tactical Air Command, Langley AFB, Virginia
 February 1991 – February 1994, director, Directorate of Programs and Evaluation, Headquarters U.S. Air Force, Washington, D.C.
 February 1994 – June 1995, director, Force Structure, Resources and Assessment, the Joint Staff, Washington, D.C.
 June 1995 – June 1996, Deputy Chief of Staff for Plans and Operations, Headquarters U.S. Air Force, Washington, D.C.
 June 1996 – June 1997, commander, U.S. Forces, Japan, and Commander, 5th Air Force, Yokota AB, Japan
 July 1997 – June 1999, vice chief of staff, Headquarters U.S. Air Force, Washington, D.C.
 June 1999 – February 2000, commander, Air Combat Command, Langley AFB, Virginia
 February 2000 – April 2002, commander in chief, North American Aerospace Defense Command and U.S. Space Command; commander, Air Force Space Command; and Department of Defense Manager for Manned Space Flight Support Operations, Peterson AFB, Colorado
 April 2002 – October 2002, commander in Chief, North American Aerospace Defense Command and U.S. Space Command, and Department of Defense Manager for Manned Space Flight Support Operations, Peterson AFB, Colorado
 October 2002 – January 1, 2005, commander, North American Aerospace Defense Command and USNORTHCOM (as U.S. Space Command by then ceased to exist and merged into USSTRATCOM), Peterson AFB, Colorado

Flight information

Rating: Command Pilot
Flight hours: More than 5,000 hours
Aircraft flown: O-2, T-38, T-39, F-4E, RF-4C, F-16, F-15, C-21 and C-37

Awards and decorations
 U.S. Air Force Command Pilot Badge
 Command Space and Missile Operations Badge
 Command Missile Operations Badge
 United States Northern Command Badge
 North American Aerospace Defense Command Badge

Other achievements

Able Aeronaut Award, Pacific Air Forces
General Jimmy Doolittle Award, Air Force Association (AFA)
Distinguished Achievement Award, AFA Tennessee Ernie Ford Chapter
Member, Council of Foreign Relations
Tom Lombardo Leadership Award, National Football Foundation and College Hall of Fame
Thomas D. White Space Award, AFA
Air Force Order of the Sword, Air Force Space Command
General Bernard A. Schriever Award, AFA
General James V. Hartinger Award, National Defense Industrial Association, Rocky Mountain Chapter

Effective dates of promotion

References

Bibliography

External links
Biography at USAF website

|-

|-

1946 births
Living people
United States Air Force Academy alumni
United States Air Force generals
Recipients of the Legion of Merit
Recipients of the Distinguished Flying Cross (United States)
United States Air Force personnel of the Vietnam War
United States Air Force personnel of the Gulf War
North American Aerospace Defense Command
Recipients of the Air Medal
Recipients of the Gallantry Cross (Vietnam)
Chevaliers of the Légion d'honneur
Recipients of the Order of the Sacred Treasure
Recipients of the Order of the Sword (United States)
Vice Chiefs of Staff of the United States Air Force
Recipients of the Defense Distinguished Service Medal
Recipients of the Air Force Distinguished Service Medal